Howard Schenken (September 28, 1903 – February 20, 1979) was an American bridge player, writer, and long-time syndicated bridge columnist. He was from New York City. He won three Bermuda Bowl titles, and set several North American records. Most remarkably he won the Life Master Pairs five times, the Spingold twelve, and the Vanderbilt Trophy ten times; the LM Pairs and Vanderbilt records that still stand today. 

Schenken is ACBL Life Master number 3, dating from 1936. He was named to the bridge hall of fame by The Bridge World in 1966, which brought the number of members to nine, all made founding members of the ACBL Hall of Fame in 1995.

Career

Schenken was playing with the Raymond Club team in the late 1920s when he was spotted by the "Father" of the game Ely Culbertson, who invited him to play as a substitute during the much publicized "Bridge Battle of the Century" against Sidney Lenz, which was won by Culbertson's team. In 1932, Schenken formed a partnership with David Burnstine who had left the "Four Horsemen", the most successful team in tournament play at the time. Burnstine created the "Bid-rite Team" consisting initially of himself, Schenken, Richard L. Frey and Charles Lochridge. By 1935, roster changes saw the team comprise Burnstine, Schenken, Oswald Jacoby (from the Four Horsemen) and Michael T. Gottlieb. They became known now as the "Four Aces" and rose to be the most successful team yet seen at contract bridge. They published a book of their methods in 1935, The Four Aces System of Contract Bridge, and tried to challenge Culbertson into another of his much publicized matches, but he declined. Schenken is recognized by the American Contract Bridge League (ACBL) as Life Master #3, one of ten named in 1936 – behind Burnstine and Jacoby.

Beside his brilliant play, Schenken was renowned for his unbreakable calm at the table. As declarer, it was impossible to tell whether he was in a comfortable contract or an impossible one (and his commanding dummy play often made an impossible one). He was a formidably difficult opponent but a remarkably easy partner. On the Four Aces, for example, he was the only one who played with every other member of the team.

The Bermuda Bowl was first held in 1950 and Schenken was on the winning USA team. He also took part in the successful defenses of the trophy in 1951 and 1953, but subsequently played on the US or North America team only on four occasions during the early 1960s. That was during the reign of the Italian Blue Team, which proved unbeatable from 1956 to 1972. Yet one great compliment came from members of the Blue Team who said, "If your team had had another Schenken, we never could have won."

Schenken was an ACBL board member for many years. In 1943 he took over the Four Aces syndicated bridge column and in 1957 merged it with the column by Frey. They wrote it jointly until 1970 when Schenken became the sole author once more; meanwhile it became the longest continuously published national bridge column.

Schenken wrote only three books but they presented some important ideas. He is credited with the discovery and introduction to the tournament world of several play techniques and examples of deceptive play which are now considered standard.

In the field of bidding theory, Schenken is credited with the idea of the forcing two-over-one response, the prepared opening bid, and the weak two bid. (The "weak two" was part of Harold Vanderbilt's Vanderbilt Club system, however.) Schenken also developed his own strong club system, the Schenken Club, played with Peter Leventritt.

Schenken died in Palm Springs, California, at age 75 in 1979.

Bridge accomplishments

Honors
 ACBL Hall of Fame, 1966

Wins
 IBL World Championship (1) 1935
 Bermuda Bowl (3) 1950, 1951, 1953
 North American Bridge Championships (34)
 Vanderbilt (10) 1934, 1935, 1937, 1938, 1946, 1950, 1955, 1956, 1957, 1964
 Asbury Park Trophy (now Spingold) (2) 1933, 1937
 Masters Teams-of-Four (now Spingold) (2) 1934, 1936
 Spingold (8) 1938, 1939, 1943, 1945, 1948, 1950, 1952, 1960
 Chicago (now Reisinger) (2) 1957, 1963
 Reisinger (1) 1968
 Men's Board-a-Match Teams (1) 1949
 Master Mixed Teams (1) 1935
 Life Master Pairs (5) 1931, 1933, 1934, 1941, 1943
 Mixed Pairs (1) 1957
 Master Individual (1) 1932
 United States Bridge Championships (1)
 Open Pair Trials (1) 1964

Runners-up
 Bermuda Bowl (3) 1961, 1963, 1965
 North American Bridge Championships (19)
 Vanderbilt (9) 1930, 1931, 1932, 1941, 1945, 1952, 1959, 1962, 1967
 Spingold (3) 1941, 1947, 1955
 Chicago (now Reisinger) (1) 1950
 Reisinger (1) 1966
 Master Mixed Teams (3) 1936, 1958, 1966
 Life Master Pairs (2) 1932, 1952

See also
 Four Aces

Publications
 Better Bidding in 15 Minutes, Expert Bidding in a Week (Simon & Schuster, 1963) 
 Howard Schenken's "Big Club": A revolutionary, highly competitive, and accurate way to bid for every bridge player (S&S, 1968) 
 The Education of a Bridge Player (S&S, 1973); London: Robert Hale, 1976 

Schenken was a nominal co-author of publications by the Four Aces, or Four Aces Bridge Studio in some catalog records. There were at least two books with mainstream editions.
 , 302 pp.
 Five-suit bridge, by the Four Aces (Simon & Schuster, 1938), Burnstine, Jacoby, Merwin D. Maier, Schenken

Notes

References

Citations
 Brian Senior, ed. [probable writer]. "The All-time Bridge Greats (4): Howard Schenken". 18th European Youth Team Championships: Daily Bulletin (Torquay, England). European Bridge League. Bulletin 4 (11 July 2002). Page 3.

External links
 

 

1903 births
1979 deaths
American contract bridge players
Bermuda Bowl players
Contract bridge writers
Place of birth missing
Writers from New York City